Anwar Oshana (born 11 June 1972) was an Assyrian-American professional boxer in the super middleweight division between 1994 and 2005. He fought 28 times, winning 23 and losing 5.

Professional career 
In 1997, he won the USA Illinois State Super Middleweight title and the IBF Great Lakes Regional Super Middleweight title. After compiling a 20 fight unbeaten run, Oshana suffered a defeat to world rated Thomas Tate. His poor defense let him down at the highest level and he suffered further losses to Omar Shieka, Jeff Lacy and Joe Spina before retiring in 2005.

Titles in boxing 
USA Illinois State Super Middleweight Champion
IBF Great Lakes Regional Super Middleweight Champion

References

External links 
 

1972 births
Assyrian sportspeople
American people of Syrian descent
American people of Syrian-Assyrian descent
Living people
Boxers from Chicago
American male boxers
Super-middleweight boxers